Acanthodactylus zagrosicus, the Zagrosian fringe-fingered lizard, is a species of lizard in the family Lacertidae. The species is endemic to Iran.

References

Acanthodactylus
Reptiles described in 2021